Zaynab Dosso (born 12 September 1999) is an Italian sprinter. She competed at the 2020 Summer Olympics, in 4 × 100 m relay.

Biography
Daughter of Ivorian parents who moved to Italy in 2002, Zaynab came to Italy in 2009 when she was ten, she acquired Italian citizenship in 2016.

Achievements

National titles
She has won four national titles at individual senior level.

Italian Athletics Championships
100 metres: 2019, 2020, 2022
Italian Athletics Indoor Championships
60 metres: 2022

Personal bests
Outdoor
100 metres – 11.19	(+1.0 m/s, Savona 2022)
Indoor
60 metres – 7.14 (Belgrade 2022)

See also
 Italian all-time lists - 100 metres
 Naturalized athletes of Italy

Notes

References

External links
 

1999 births
Living people
Italian female sprinters
Athletics competitors of Fiamme Azzurre
Ivorian emigrants to Italy
Naturalised citizens of Italy
Italian Athletics Championships winners
People from Man, Ivory Coast
European Athletics Championships medalists